Avery is a small lunar impact crater located near the eastern limb of the Moon. This is a circular, bowl-shaped formation with a small interior floor. It lies near the western edge of Mare Smythii. To the east is the crater Haldane, and to the southwest is Carrillo.  Gilbert lies to the southwest.

Avery was previously designated as Gilbert U before being named by the IAU in 1976.  It is named after the famous biomedical researcher Oswald Avery.

References

External links
 

Impact craters on the Moon